Arild Hetleøen (born 28 December 1942) is a Norwegian footballer. He played in four matches for the Norway national football team from 1970 to 1971.

References

External links
 

1942 births
Living people
Norwegian footballers
Norway international footballers
Place of birth missing (living people)
Association footballers not categorized by position